The Good Old Days is a 1939 British comedy film directed by Roy William Neill. Written by Austin Melford and John Dighton based on a story by Ralph Smart, it stars Max Miller, Hal Walters and Kathleen Gibson. The film tells the story of a group of entertainers struggling to obtain permission to perform at a tavern in 1840.

It is on the British Film Institute's BFI 75 Most Wanted list of lost films.

Cast
 Max Miller as Alexander the Greatest
 Hal Walters as Titch
 Kathleen Gibson as Polly
 H.F. Maltby as Randolph Macaulay
 Martita Hunt as Sara Macaulay
 Anthony Shaw as Lovelace
 Allan Jeayes as Shadwell
 Sam Wilkinson as Croker
 Roy Emerton as Grimes
 Phyllis Monkman as Mrs. Bennett
 Ian Fleming as Lord Wakely

See also
List of lost films

References

External links
 BFI 75 Most Wanted entry, with extensive notes
 

1939 comedy films
1939 films
British comedy films
British black-and-white films
Films directed by Roy William Neill
Lost British films
Films set in 1840
Lost comedy films
1939 lost films
1930s English-language films
1930s British films